Antti Joonas "Jone" Nikula (born 30 March 1970) is Finnish television and radio personality and a jack-of-all-trades in the music industry. He became well known as a judge in the TV show Idols. 

Before his TV popularity, Nikula has – among other things – been a host on the Finnish radio station Radio City, and marketing manager of EMI Music Finland. Since 2007, Nikula and Kotiteollisuus frontman Jouni Hynynen have hosted Äijät, a TV show about the professions and (in the second season in 2008) hobbies of "real men". He has written a history book about Finnish heavy metal music, Rauta-aika (Iron Age), and worked as the tour manager of Finnish glam rock band Hanoi Rocks. Starting early 2007, he has been hosting evening and daytime shows on Nelonen Media's rock music radio station, Radio Rock.  

Nikula is a Captain in reserve in the Finnish Defence Forces. His father is former Chancellor of Justice of Finland Paavo Nikula, and his mother is art historian Riitta Nikula. He was a competitor in the first season of the Finnish version of Dancing with the Stars, called Tanssii tähtien kanssa in 2006, finishing third. Nikula was a judge in the fifth season of Tanssii tähtien kanssa.

References

1970 births
Living people
Finnish radio presenters
Finnish television presenters